Falsamblesthis macilenta is a species of beetle in the family Cerambycidae. It was described by Gounelle in 1910. It is known from Ecuador.

References

Forsteriini
Beetles described in 1910